"After Forever" is a song by English rock band Black Sabbath.  The song was released on their third studio album Master of Reality in 1971, the lyrics were written by Geezer Butler while the music was written by Tony Iommi.

History
The lyrics of the song "After Forever", written by Geezer Butler, who was brought up strictly Catholic, focus entirely on Christian themes according to some historians. Although the album jacket credits Iommi alone as the composer of this song (including lyrics), the Black Sabbath Black Box Set refutes the album jacket credit and gives credit to this song (along with "Orchid" and "Embryo") to all four band members in keeping with their wishes to remain a democratic band. At the time, some such as religious and conservative groups viewed Black Sabbath as Satanists (which the band had consistently denied) due to their dark sound, image and lyrics, with occultism and horror as a recurring theme. "After Forever" was released as a single along with "Fairies Wear Boots" in 1971.

Covers
 "After Forever" has been covered by Biohazard for Nativity in Black, a Black Sabbath tribute album. 
 Aurora Borealis for Hell Rules: Tribute to Black Sabbath, Vol. 2. 
 Deliverance on their 1992 album What a Joke. 
 Shelter on their 1992 album Quest for Certainty.  
 Frost Like Ashes on their debut EP Pure As the Blood Covered Snow.
 Troglodyte Dawn with rewritten lyrics and titled "Forever After" on their 2003 debut album Troglodyte Dawn.
 Stryper have recorded the song for their 2015 album Fallen. It was mistakenly released early as a free download for people pre-ordering the album.
 Hateful Agony feat. Rick Splicer for A Tribute To BLACK SABBATH (2021) [AMT-006].

Personnel
Ozzy Osbourne – lead vocals
Tony Iommi – guitar, synthesizer
Geezer Butler – bass guitar
Bill Ward – drums

References

1971 songs
Black Sabbath songs
Songs written by Tony Iommi
Songs written by Geezer Butler
Songs about religion